Valencia M. Seay (born July 6, 1953) is an American politician. She is a member of the Georgia State Senate from the 34th District, serving since 2010. She is a member of the Democratic party.

References

External links
 Profile at the Georgia State Senate
 Campaign website

Living people
Democratic Party Georgia (U.S. state) state senators
1953 births
Politicians from Atlanta
Women state legislators in Georgia (U.S. state)
21st-century American politicians
21st-century American women politicians